This is a list of Wildlife Management Areas in Arkansas. All counties are represented except Boone, Chicot, Crittenden, Dallas, Fulton, Grant, Jackson, Lincoln, and St. Francis County.

See also

References

Wildlife Management Areas
 
Arkansas